There are 64 listed buildings (Swedish: byggnadsminne) in Värmland County.

Arvika Municipality

Filipstad Municipality

Grums Municipality

Hagfors Municipality

Karlstad Municipality

Kil Municipality

Kristinehamn Municipality

Munkfors Municipality

Storfors Municipality

Sunne Municipality

Säffle Municipality

Torsby Municipality

Årjäng Municipality

External links

  Bebyggelseregistret

Listed buildings in Sweden